Lorraine Francis (born 5 November 1958) is an Irish children's writer.

Biography
Born Lorraine Francis in Athlone, Ireland on 5 November 1958, Francis has worked as a librarian for a number of years after completing a year of art college and taking time out for travel. She began writing for children in 1999 and most recently has been working with illustrator Pieter Gaudesaboos. He is an artist while Francis has been runner up in the Francis MacManus Award. She was published in an anthology edited by Hugh Leonard and Clare Boylan. Her children's books have been used in education in both Ireland and the United States.

Bibliography
 Réveille toi, Walter!, 2019
 Een huis vol vrienden, 2019
 Word wakker Walter, 2016
 Uyan Walter, 2017
 Sammy and the Skyscraper Sandwich, 2013
 Het Boek van Mannetje Koek, 2009
 The great trolley race, 2003
 Pandora's Lunch Box, 2002
 The Origami Bird, 2001
 Save Our Sweet Shop, 2000
 Lulu's Tutu, 1999

References and sources

1958 births
Living people
21st-century Irish women writers
Irish children's writers
People from Athlone